Monkland and Stretford is a civil parish in the English county and unitary authority of Herefordshire. The population of the civil parish at the 2011 census was 178.

The main settlement of the parish is Monkland.

References

External links

Civil parishes in Herefordshire